Thomas McMurray may refer to:
 Thomas McMurray (sportsman), Irish cricketer and footballer
 Thomas S. McMurray, mayor of Denver, Colorado
 Thomas Porter McMurray, British orthopaedic surgeon